Sorond is a village in Deyhuk Rural District, Deyhuk District, Tabas County, South Khorasan Province, Iran. At the 2006 census, its population was 197, in 47 families.

References 

Populated places in Tabas County